The Mixed technical routine competition of the 2020 European Aquatics Championships was held on 10 May 2021.

Results
The final was held at 17:30.

References

Mixed technical routine